

Incumbents
President of Georgia: Eduard Shevardnadze
State Minister: Avtandil Jorbenadze
Chairperson of the Parliament: Nino Burjanadze

Events 
January 15 – Georgian police forces under the personal supervision of Interior Minister Koba Narchemashvili launch the first phase of anti-criminal operation in the Pankisi Gorge in Georgia's border with Chechnya.
March 2 – Georgia's breakaway Abkhazia holds parliamentary election, not recognized by the international community as legal.
April 2 – Georgia agrees to withdraw its Defense Ministry troops from Kodori Gorge, the only part of Abkhazia more or less under the control of Georgia.
April 25 – The 4.8  Tbilisi earthquake shook the area with a maximum MSK intensity of VII–VIII (Very strong – Damaging), causing 5–6 deaths and 52–70 injuries. Damage was estimated at $160–350 million. 
May 27 – The United States-sponsored Train-and-Equip program launched in the Georgian armed forces.
June 2 – Georgia holds the second local self-governance elections.
August 19 – President of Georgia Eduard Shevardnadze announces the start of an all-out "anti-criminal and counterterrorist operation" in the Pankisi Gorge.
August 23 – Russian fighter jets bomb the Georgian villages bordering Chechnya, killing one and injuring several civilians; the Organization for Security and Co-operation in Europe Observers Mission to Georgia officially confirms the fact, but the Russian authorities reject it.
October 14 – President Shevardnadze and Patriarch of Georgia Ilia II sign a constitutional agreement between the state and the Georgian Orthodox Church at the Svetitskhoveli Cathedral in Mtskheta.
November 22 – President Shevardnadze makes an official bid for NATO accession at the Euro-Atlantic Partnership Council session in Prague.
December 3 – Georgia ratifies the construction of the Baku–Tbilisi–Ceyhan pipeline.

Deaths 
February 25 – Nugzar Sajaia, Georgian National Security Council secretary (born 1942); suicide.
May 19 – Otar Lordkipanidze, archaeologist and anthropologist (born 1930), natural causes.
December 19 – Kote Makharadze, a popular actor and sportscaster (born 1925); cerebrovascular disease.
November 20 – Kakhi Asatiani, businessman and former soccer star (born 1947); assassinated.

References 

Timeline 2002. Civil Georgia. Accessed on February 11, 2008.

 
Georgia
Years of the 21st century in Georgia (country)
2000s in Georgia (country)
Georgia
Georgia